Miloš Rnić (Serbian Cyrillic: Милош Рнић; born 24 January 1989) is a Serbian footballer who plays for Smederevo 1924.

Career
Born in Belgrade, Rnić began his career in his native Serbia playing for FK Radnički Nova Pazova. He played in FK Radnički Nova Pazova in five season. In 2012, he moved to Novi Pazar playing in the Serbian SuperLiga. He made his debut in Serbian SuperLiga playing against FK Radnički Niš.

References

External links

1989 births
Living people
Footballers from Belgrade
Serbian footballers
Association football defenders
Serbian expatriate footballers
Serbian First League players
Expatriate footballers in Belarus
Expatriate footballers in Albania
Serbian expatriate sportspeople in Belarus
Serbian expatriate sportspeople in Albania
Serbian SuperLiga players
FK Radnički Nova Pazova players
FK Novi Pazar players
FC Minsk players
FK Radnički 1923 players
FK Metalac Gornji Milanovac players
Flamurtari Vlorë players
FK Radnički Pirot players
OFK Bačka players
FK Smederevo players